Jesús López Pacheco (1930 in Madrid, Spain – April 6, 1997 in Toronto, Ontario, Canada) was a novelist, translator, poet and professor of Spanish.

López Pacheco studied philosophy and arts (Romance languages) at the University of Madrid. His communist sympathies soon became evident and he participated in the fledgling anti-Franco student protests.

López Pacheco first published collections of poetry: Dejad crecer este Silencio (Premio Adonais 1953), Mi corazón se llama Cudillero (1961), Pongo la mano sobre España (1961) Canciones del amor prohibido (1961).

His 1958 his novel Central Eléctrica discussed progress, workers and social injustice. It was short listed for the Premio Nadal.

López Pacheco left Spain in 1968, accepting a one-year position at the University of Western Ontario in London, Ontario. He would stay there until his retirement in 1994, when he moved to Toronto. He was a professor emeritus at the time of his death.

In London he would translate works of English and American poets, as well as publish his own poetry (Delitos contra la Esperanza (1970)), another novel (La hoja de parra (1977)), a short story anthology (Lucha contra el Murciélago (1990)), and a play (Máquina contra la Soledad o la Scherezada electrónica (1989)). His Asilo poético: poemas escritos en Canadá 1968–1990 (1991) discussed his political self-exile. Finally, he published Ecólogas y urbanas, manual para evitar un fin de siglo siniestro in 1996.

Family
López Pacheco married María de la Soledad (Marisol) Lázaro Morán. The couple had three children: Bruno Lazaro, a Canadian-Spanish film director, Alexandra Lopez-Pacheco (born in 1960), a freelance journalist and partner in a Canadian-based writing and editing firm called Words Matter, and Fabio Lopez Lazaro, a university history professor, who has taught in Canada and the United States.

Selected bibliography
 
 
 
 
 
 
 
 
 
 
 
 
 
  (posthumous)
  (posthumous)

External links
 

1930 births
1997 deaths
People from Madrid
Spanish communists
Spanish novelists
Spanish male novelists
Academic staff of the University of Western Ontario
20th-century Spanish novelists
20th-century Spanish poets
Spanish male poets